The 2022–23 Primera División de El Salvador, also known as the Liga Pepsi, is the 24th season and 46th and 47th Primera División tournament, El Salvador's top football division, since its establishment of an Apertura and Clausura format. C.D. FAS and TBD are the defending champions of both Apertura and Clausura tournaments respectively. The league will consist of 12 teams. There will be two seasons conducted under identical rules, with each team playing a home and away game against the other clubs for a total of 22 games per tournament. At the end of each half-season tournament, the top six teams in that tournament's regular season standings will take part in the playoffs.

The champions of Apertura or Clausura with the better aggregate record will qualify for the 2023 CONCACAF Champions League. The other champion, and the runner-up with the better aggregate record will qualify for the 2023 CONCACAF League. Should the same team win both tournaments, both runners-up will qualify for CONCACAF League. Should the final of both tournaments features the same two teams, the semi-finalist with the better aggregate record will qualify for CONCACAF League.

Teams

Promotion and relegation 

A total of 12 teams will contest the league, including 11 sides from the 2021–22 Primera División and 1 promoted from the 2021–22 Segunda División.

Dragon was promoted to the Primera División in June 2022 after defeating A.D. Municipal in a playoff match by a score of 0-0.

C.D. Municipal Limeño was relegated to the 2022–23 Segunda División.

Stadiums and locations

Notable events

Notable death from Apertura 2022 season and 2023 Clausura season 
The following people associated with the Primera Division have died between the middle of 2022 and middle of 2023.

 Saul Lorenzo Rivero (Uruguayan ex coach of FAS, Aguila, Isidro Metapan)
 Nahún Corro Bazan (Mexican, ex Aguila player)
 Kiril Dojcinovski (Macedonian ex coach of LA Firpo, Limeno)
 Romeo Blanco (ex Alianza and Atletico Marte)
 Italo Maldonado (ex ANTEL player)
 Julio César Madrid (ex Dragon player)
 Raúl Corcio Zavaleta (ex Aguila, Santa Anita, Aguila, Sonsonate, Atletico Marte, Limeno)
 Genaro Sermeño (Ex FAS player)
 Remberto Santillana (Ex FAS, Once Lobos and Metapan FC coach)
 Antonio “Chueño” Landaverde (Ex FAS player)
 Francisco Osorto (ex Santiagueno, Limeno player)
 José Angel Guerra "Gallito Guerra" (ex Platense player)

Change of ownership
On 15 April 2022, FAS announced that they had been acquired by American ownership group AMG Sports

FESFUT removal and Games suspensions
On the 20th of July, The Governmental National Sports Institute (INDES) in association with the Attorney general raided Salvadoran Football Federation (FESFUT) in relation to money laundering and fraudulent administration. INDES issued an administrative resolution ordering the dismissal of FESFUT directors and the creation of a Normalizing Commission.

As a result of this internal crisis, All three main divisions games from round 2 to 4 were suspended due to referees not showing up.

FIFA  it could suspend El Salvador if its state-led sports institute removes the heads of the Salvadoran Football Federation (FESFUT) in favor of hand-picked officials, according to a letter shared by the federation online.

After a month and a half and with the imposition of a FIFA Regulation Committee in the FESFUT, plus the delivery of credentials by INDES, the first division (as well as the second and third) obtained the green light to be able to resume their tournament, which was interrupted after a disputed date.

The Primera Division announced August 31, 2022 that the season will resume the Apertura 2022 tournament on September 17, 2022.

New main sponsor for the league
Instituto Nacional de los Deportes (INDES) signed a five year contract with Primera División de El Salvador for five year, worth 7 millions USD (1.4 million per year). The league will be named as Liga INDES Apertura / Clausura”. 

 Managerial changes 

 Before the start of the season 

 During the Apertura season 

 Between the Apertura and Clausura season 

 Clausura seasons 

Apertura 2022
Phase 1
Group A

Group B

Playoffs
Quarterfinals
First legs

Second legsFAS won 5-4 on AggregateAguila won 1-0 on Aggregate Jocoro won 4-3 on penalties, after tying 1-1 aggregatePlatense won 2-1 on aggregate Semifinals
First legs

Second legs4-4. FAS won 4-3 on penalties4-4. Jocoro won 4-2 on penalties Final 

{| style="font-size: 90%" cellspacing="0" cellpadding="0" align=center
|colspan="5" style="padding-top: 0.6em; text-align:center"|Jocoro
|-
!width="25"| !!width="25"|
|-
|GK ||22||  Hector Ramirez
|-
|DF ||4||  Salvador Galindo ||    
|-
|DF ||2||  Carlos Arevalo
|-
|DF ||19||  Elvis Claros
|-
|DF ||23||  Nelson Moreno ||    
|-
|MF ||5||  Henry Maldonado 
|-
|MF ||10||  Yuvini Salamanca 
|-
|MF ||11||  Ronald Aparicio ||  
|-
|MF ||16||  Juan Carlos Argueta 
|-
|MF ||17||  Junior Padilla ||   
|-
|FW ||23||  Henry Romero ||   
|-
|colspan=5|Substitutes:
|-
|MF ||12||  Enmanuel Hernandez || ||     
|-
|MF ||27||  Carlos Garcia || ||  
|-
|MF ||29||  Joel Turcios || ||  
|-
|MF ||20||  Roque Caballero || ||  
|-
|MF ||'''24||  Oscar Franco || ||  
|-
|colspan=5|Manager:|-
|colspan=5| Jose Romero
|}

 Apertura 2022 Records 
 Records 
 Best home records: TBD (00 points out of 33 points)
 Worst home records: TBD (0 points out of 33 points)
 Best away records : TBD (00 points out of 33 points)
 Worst away records : TBD  (0 points out of 33 points)
 Most goals scored: Aguila (23 goals)
 Fewest goals scored: Firpo (6 goals)
 Fewest goals conceded : Dragon (7 goals)
 Most goals conceded : Chalatenango (18 goals)

 Scoring 
 First goal of the season:  Juan Carlos Argueta for Jocoro against Atletico Marte, 8 minutes (July 10, 2022)
 First goal by a foreign player:  Brian Calabrese for Aguila against Once Deportivo, 55th minutes (July 10, 2022)
 Fastest goal in a match: 2 Minutes  Bryan Paz for Once Deportivo against Santa Tecla (October 2,2022)
 Goal scored at the latest goal in a match: 90+4 minutes  Dustin Corea  goal for Aguila against Platense, (September 19, 2022)
 First penalty Kick of the season:  Miguel Lemus for Chalatenango against LA Firpo, 67th minutes (September 18, 2022)
 Widest winning margin: 6 goals Aguila 6–0 LA Firpo (October 13, 2022)
 First hat-trick of the season:  Bryan Paz for  Once Deportivo against Santa Tecla  (October 2, 2022)
 First own goal of the season:  Geovanny Henriquez (Chalatenango) for Platense (September 25, 2022)
 Most goals in a match: 6 goals Aguila 6–0 LA Firpo (October 13, 2022)
 Most goals by one team in a match: 6 goals Aguila 6–0 LA Firpo (October 13, 2022)
 Most goals in one half by one team: 4 goalsJocoro 4-2 (4-2) Platense (1st half, November, 2022)
 Most goals scored by losing team: 3 goals TBD 3–5 TBD (2022)
 Most goals by one player in a single match: 3 goals Bryan Paz for Once Deportivo against Santa Tecla  (October 2, 2022 Juan Carlos Argueta for Jocoro against Chalatenango (October 24, 2022)
 Players that scored a hat-trick':
 Bryan Paz for Once Deportivo against Santa Tecla  (October 2, 2022)
 Juan Carlos Argueta for Jocoro against Chalatenango (October 24, 2022)

Clausura 2023
 League table 

 Clausura 2023 Records 
 Records 
 Best home records: TBD (00 points out of 33 points)
 Worst home records: TBD (0 points out of 33 points)
 Best away records : TBD (00 points out of 33 points)
 Worst away records : TBD  (0 points out of 33 points)
 Most goals scored: TBD (00 goals)
 Fewest goals scored: TBD (00 goals)
 Fewest goals conceded : TBD (00 goals)
 Most goals conceded : TBD (00 goals)

 Scoring 
 First goal of the season:  Santos Ortiz for  Aguila against Santa Tecla, 16 minutes (January 29, 2023)
 First goal by a foreign player:   Victor Landázuri for Santa Tecla against Aguila, 23rd minutes (January 29, 2023)
 Fastest goal in a match: 15 Seconds  TBD for TBD against TBD (2023)
 Goal scored at the latest goal in a match: 90+7 minutes  Michell Mercado goal for Alianza against Platense, (January 30, 2023)
 First penalty Kick of the season:  TBD for TBD against TBD, 23rd minutes ( 2023)
 Widest winning margin: 3 goals Alianza  3–0 Platense (January 30, 2023)
 First hat-trick of the season:  TBD for  TBD against TBD  ( 2023)
 First own goal of the season:  TBD (TBD) for TBD (2023)
 Most goals in a match: 8 goals Dragon 7-1 Chalatenango (February 12, 2023)
 Most goals by one team in a match: 7 goals Dragon 7-1 Chalatenango (February 12, 2023)
 Most goals in one half by one team: 4 goals Dragon 4-0 (7-1) Chalatenango (1st half, February 12, 2023)
 Most goals scored by losing team: 3 goals TBD 3–5 TBD (2023)
 Most goals by one player in a single match: 3 goals TBD for  TBD against TBD  ( 2023)
 Players that scored a hat-trick':
 TBD for  TBD against TBD  ( 2023)

 List of foreign players in the league 
This is a list of foreign players in the 2022–23 season. The following players:

 Have played at least one game for the respective club.
 Have not been capped for the El Salvador national football team on any level, independently from the birthplace

A new rule was introduced this season, that clubs can have four foreign players per club and can only add a new player if there is an injury or a player is released and it is before the close of the season transfer window. \Águila  Luis Acuna 
  Brian Calabrese  
  Edgar Medrano 
  Jahir Barraza 
  Jomal Williams 
  Franco Toloza
  Francisco Aman 
  Carlos Daniel Pimienta
  Flavio ScaroneAlianza  Camilo Delgado 
  Mitchel Mercado 
  Victor Labndazuri 
  Camilo Mancilla
  Hugo Palacios
  Miguel MurilloAtletico Marte  Luis Arturo Peralta 
  Tardelius Pena 
  Yeffer Duvan Sanchez 
  John Machado
  Sandro Melgarejo 
  Sergio Escudero 
  Luis IbarraChalatenango  Jhony Moran 
  Hector Renteria 
  Dieter Vargas 
  Henry Niño  
  Kemal Beckford  
  André Hurtado 
  Dany Cetre
  Joe Arboleda 
  Eder MoscosoDragon  Kevin Moreno 
  Jhon Montaño
  Luis Angulo
  Yair ArboledaFAS  Yílmar Filigrana 
  Omar Rosas 
  Pier Larrauri 
  Santiago Carrera 
  Luis Ángel Mendoza 
  Wilson Gómez
  Juan Camilo Salazar 
  Luis Madrigal
  Rolando BlackburnFirpo  Daniel Floró Da Silva 
  Tales Jose da Silva 
  Steven Riascos  
  Heiner Caicedo
  Raúl Peñaranda  
  Felipe Andres Brito
  Sebastian Julio Munoz
  Tardelius Pena Isidro Metapán  Gregori Diaz 
  Luca Orozco 
  Leandro Martin 
  Carlos Salazar 
  Luis PeraltaJocoro  Henry Romero 
  Junior Padilla 
  Santiago Córdoba 
  Diego Angulo 
  Roque Caballero 
  Oscar Franco 
  Luis Acuna
  Camilo Delgado
  Kemal Beckford Once Deportivo  Ronald Benavides   
  Adrián Muro  
  David Boquin
  Jesús Dautt
  José Luis Calderón 
  Jomal Williams Platense  Juan Marcelo Aimar 
  John Machado 
  Gabriel Eduardo Giacopetti 
  Wilber Arizala 
  Briand Andrés Díaz 
  Omar Rosas
  Krisean LopezSanta Tecla'''
  Victor Labndazuri 
  Joel Almeida
  Yessy Mina 
  Elio Castro
  Eloy Rodríguez  
  Andres Quejeda   
  José Miguel Barreto 

 (player released during the Apertura season due suspension of season, Never played a game) (player released during the Apertura season) (player released between the Apertura and Clausura seasons) (player released during the Clausura season) (player naturalized for the Clausura season) (player released beginning the Clausura season, Never played a game)''

References

External links
 https://laprimera.com.sv/ (Official website)

Primera División de Fútbol Profesional seasons
El Salvador
1
Football in El Salvador